Bucindolol is a non-selective beta blocker with additional weak alpha-blocking properties and some intrinsic sympathomimetic activity. It was under review by the FDA in the United States for the treatment of heart failure in 2009, but was rejected due to issues pertaining to integrity of data submitted.

See also 
 Beta blocker
Primidolol

References 

Beta blockers
Antihypertensive agents
Tryptamines
N-tert-butyl-phenoxypropanolamines
2-Hydroxybenzonitrile ethers